DSRR may refer to:

Delta Southern Railroad
Discovery, Search, Ranking and Return - the major components of Web search engines
Dynamic scale right round - a software instruction in the Burroughs large systems instruction set